Liverpool Great Howard Street railway station was a station in Liverpool, Lancashire, England. The station was opened on 20 November 1848 and was intended to be the western terminus of the Liverpool and Bury Railway, closing to passengers in July 1851 after the line was extended to Tithebarn Street. Freight services continued until closure on 30 September 1963.

References

Disused railway stations in Liverpool
Railway stations in Great Britain opened in 1848
Railway stations in Great Britain closed in 1851
Former Lancashire and Yorkshire Railway stations